The 2020 San Miguel Beermen season was the 45th season of the franchise in the Philippine Basketball Association (PBA).

Draft picks

Roster

Philippine Cup

Eliminations

Standings

Game log

|-bgcolor=ccffcc
| 1
| March 8
| Magnolia
| W 94–78
| Moala Tautuaa (20)
| Arwind Santos (15)
| Ross, Romeo (7)
| Smart Araneta Coliseum
| 1–0

|-bgcolor=ffcccc
| 2
| October 13
| Rain or Shine
| L 83–87
| Marcio Lassiter (20)
| Moala Tautuaa (11)
| Tautuaa, Ross (5)
| AUF Sports Arena & Cultural Center
| 1–1
|-bgcolor=ffcccc
| 3
| October 16
| TNT
| L 88–107
| Alex Cabagnot (15)
| Arwind Santos (10)
| Gelo Alolino (3)
| AUF Sports Arena & Cultural Center
| 1–2
|-bgcolor=ccffcc
| 4
| October 19
| Terrafirma
| W 105–98
| Moala Tautuaa (25)
| Arwind Santos (14)
| Marcio Lassiter (7)
| AUF Sports Arena & Cultural Center
| 2–2
|-bgcolor=ccffcc
| 5
| October 24
| Alaska
| W 92–88
| Alex Cabagnot (19)
| Arwind Santos (10)
| Ross, Tautuaa (6)
| AUF Sports Arena & Cultural Center
| 3–2
|-bgcolor=ccffcc
| 6
| October 28
| Meralco
| W 89–82
| Moala Tautuaa (23)
| Arwind Santos (11)
| Chris Ross (4)
| AUF Sports Arena & Cultural Center
| 4–2

|-bgcolor=ccffcc
| 7
| November 3
| Blackwater
| W 90–88 OT
| Moala Tautuaa (26)
| Moala Tautuaa (26)
| Alex Cabagnot (8)
| AUF Sports Arena & Cultural Center
| 5–2
|-bgcolor=ffcccc
| 8
| November 5
| Phoenix
| L 103–110
| Moala Tautuaa (21)
| Arwind Santos (8)
| Alex Cabagnot (8)
| AUF Sports Arena & Cultural Center
| 5–3
|-bgcolor=ffcccc
| 9
| November 6
| NLEX
| L 90–124
| Paul Zamar (23)
| Arwind Santos (5)
| 4 players (3)
| AUF Sports Arena & Cultural Center
| 5–4
|-bgcolor=ccffcc
| 10
| November 8
| Ginebra
| W 81–66
| Moala Tautuaa (20)
| Chris Ross (14)
| Chris Ross (4)
| AUF Sports Arena & Cultural Center
| 6–4
|-bgcolor=ccffcc
| 11
| November 10
| Northport
| W 120–99
| Arwind Santos (23)
| Arwind Santos (11)
| Marcio Lassiter (7)
| AUF Sports Arena & Cultural Center
| 7–4

Transactions

Trades

Preseason

Free Agency

Addition

Subtraction

Rookie Signings

References

San Miguel Beermen seasons
San Miguel Beermen